Halfweg-Zwanenburg is a railway station in west Halfweg and near Zwanenburg, Netherlands. It was opened on 9 December 2012 on the Amsterdam–Rotterdam railway

History
There was a station in Halfweg between 20 September 1839 and 2 October 1927; the new station lies roughly where the original station did. The station was opened in December 2012. The station primarily services Halfweg and Zwanenburg, but also Haarlemmerliede and other surrounding small settlements.

Train services
As of 9 December 2018, the following train services call at this station:

National rail

Bus services

References

External links
NS website 
Dutch public transport travel planner 

Railway stations in North Holland
Railway stations opened in 2012